Nitzan Shirazi (‎, 21 July 1971 – 22 July 2014) was an Israeli association football player and manager.

Playing career 
Born in Tel Aviv in 1971, at the age of eight he played in the Bnei Yehuda kids team, then moved to the youth team and led the team to win the championship.

Shirazi moved to the Bnei Yehuda senior team at age of 17 and was immediately summoned to the youth national team but did not receive a summons to the adult team. Later in his career he left the Bnei Yehuda and went to play in lower divisions and finally retired from playing due to injury.

Manager career 
After retiring from the game, Shirazi began coaching Bnei Yehuda youth team. before the beginning of the 2004 season he was appointed assistant manager of Bnei Yehuda senior team, Guy Levy. After Levy's resignation, he was appointed as the team manager. During the 2005–06 season he extended his contract.

In the 2006–07, Shirazi led Bnei Yehuda to the Israeli State Cup final against Hapoel Tel Aviv but Yeghia Yavruyan goal prevent Shirazi winning the cup after 19 years.

In the 2007–08 was Shirazi's final season in Bnei Yehuda. After persuasion agreed Nitzan Shirazi to continue in his position as the manager of Bnei Yehuda fifth year, but after a six consecutive losses Shirazi resigned after the 11th round ended four and a half seasons as the manager of Bnei Yehuda.

On 21 August 2008, he was appointed the manager of Maccabi Petah Tikva  but did not continue coaching the team next season.

On 9 February 2010, Shirazi was appointed director of Hapoel Haifa.
On 5 June 2010, he was appointed the manager of Hapoel Haifa. On 26 November 2011, he resigned from Hapoel Haifa.

On 11 January 2012, he was appointed the manager of Hapoel Tel Aviv. On 27 September 2012, Shirazi stepped down as manager due to health reasons.

Personal life 
Son of the Meir Shirazi, Bnei Yehuda team manager in the past, and the brother of Hezi Shirazi, a former player.

He was married to Shusha Shirazi until his death from brain cancer in 2014.

Honours
Toto Cup:
Runner-up (1): 2011-12
Israeli Premier League:
Runner-up (1): 2011-12
Israel State Cup:
Winner (1): 2012

References

1971 births
2014 deaths
Israeli Jews
Israeli footballers
Liga Leumit players
Footballers from Tel Aviv
Bnei Yehuda Tel Aviv F.C. players
Hapoel Kfar Shalem F.C. players
Hapoel Kfar Saba F.C. players
Bnei Yehuda Tel Aviv F.C. managers
Maccabi Petah Tikva F.C. managers
Hapoel Haifa F.C. managers
Hapoel Tel Aviv F.C. managers
Israeli people of Iranian-Jewish descent
Association football midfielders
Israeli football managers
Deaths from brain cancer in Israel